Rosalind Dymond Cartwright (1922–2021), a neuroscientist, was a Professor Emerita in the Department of Psychology and in the Neuroscience Division of the Graduate College, Rush University. She was known to her peers as "Queen of Dreams". In 2004 she was named Distinguished Scientist of the Year by the Sleep Research Society.

Personal life and education 
The daughter of Henry Falk, a real estate developer, and Stella (Hein) Falk, a poet, Rosalind (Falk) Dymond Cartwright was born in New York City on December 30, 1922.

Her undergraduate and master’s degrees were from the University of Toronto. She earned her Ph.D. with the dissertation, Empathic Ability, an Exploratory Study, at Cornell University in 1949.

She was married four times, twice to the same man, Richard Dennis. Her other spouses were William Dymond and Desmond Cartwright.

Rosalind Cartwright died in Chicago on January 15, 2021, at the age of 98.

Career 
Penelope Green of The New York Times wrote, "Nicknamed the Queen of Dreams by her peers, Cartwright studied the role of dreaming in divorce-induced depression, worked with sleep apnea patients and their frustrated spouses, and helped open one of the first sleep disorder clinics."

Cartwright's early faculty career included two years at Mount Holyoke College and twelve years at the University of Chicago. She built a sleep lab in 1962 at the University of Illinois College of Medicine, and studied REM sleep and dreaming. In 1977 she joined the faculty of the Graduate College at Rush University Medical Center, as chair of the Department of Behavioral Sciences and later the Department of Psychology and the Neuroscience Division, and she founded the sleep disorder research and treatment center there.

She became professor emerita in 2008.

Selected publications

Books

Selected articles

Awards, honors 
 1988: Eminent Woman in Psychology, 90th Annual APA Convention
 1993: Award for Distinguished Contributions to Basic Research in Psychology, American Association of Applied and Preventive Psychology
 2004: Distinguished Scientist Award, Sleep Research Society, an award for "significant, original, and sustained scientific contributions to the sleep and circadian research field... influential research spanning an entire career".

See also 
 Sleep disorder
 Dream

References

External links 
  (video, 53:40 minute)
 (video, 7:16 minute. Carter Memorial begins at 4:05.)
Arizona man says he was sleepwalking when he killed wife (1998 CNN interview)

1922 births
2021 deaths
American women psychiatrists
Rush Medical College faculty
University of Toronto alumni
Cornell University alumni
21st-century American women